The Greater Sudbury municipal election, 2000 was held in the city of Greater Sudbury, Ontario, Canada on November 13, 2000. All municipal elections in the province of Ontario are held on the same date.

The election chose the mayor and city councillors who would sit on the new Greater Sudbury City Council from 2000 to 2003, as well as trustees for the four school boards (Rainbow District School Board, Sudbury Catholic District School Board, Conseil scolaire de district du Grand Nord de l'Ontario and Conseil scolaire de district catholique du Nouvel-Ontario) that serve the city.

Issues

The city of Greater Sudbury, in its current form, did not yet exist on the election date, but was legislated to come into effect on January 1, 2001. On the election date, the former government structure of the Regional Municipality of Sudbury and its seven constituent municipalities was still in place. The election, however, was held to choose the new city council.

The municipal amalgamation was controversial and unpopular, especially in the suburban municipalities. Virtually all of the municipal councils had only nominal authority over their own affairs throughout the year, as much of their power was transferred to the appointed transition board — consisting of Jim Ashcroft, Ron MacDonald, George Lund, Jim Griffin, Maurice Lamoureux, Gaetan Doucet and Terry Lee — which was overseeing the amalgamation. For example, Valley East's city council attempted in June to reduce its property taxes due to a budget surplus, but was overruled by the board as the council had lost its authority to adjust taxes during the transition period. The transition board also had sole authority over issues such as staffing decisions, user fees for municipal services, the possible closure of some public library branches, the structure and status of Greater Sudbury Utilities, and the new city's organizational structure, budget and tax assessment rates for 2001. Its operations throughout the year were frequently criticized as secretive and undemocratic, with some critics, including the Canadian Union of Public Employees, alleging that the board was preparing a sweeping privatization plan. Lamoureux, a former mayor of the pre-amalgamation city of Sudbury, also faced some controversy when he resigned from the transition board to register as a candidate for city council.

By election day, the transition board claimed that it had identified $13.8 million in savings as a result of the amalgamation process.

Election and inauguration
With many incumbent councillors from all of the old municipalities running for a vastly reduced number of seats on the new amalgamated city council, many respected longtime councillors went down to defeat. Losses included longtime Sudbury councillors Ricardo de la Riva and Jim Ilnitski, Walden mayor Dick Johnstone, and Nickel Centre councillor Russ Thompson.

The new council was nominally sworn in on December 9, 2000, at the same time as in other Ontario municipalities; however, this was purely ceremonial and the council was unable to conduct any city business until the transition board's political authority was transferred back to them on January 1, 2001.

Mayoral race

The winner of the mayoral race was Jim Gordon, the long-serving mayor of the former city of Sudbury.  Gordon did not face serious opposition, and secured over 80 per cent of the vote.

Council races

Ward 1
Two to be elected.

Ward 2
Two to be elected.

Ward 3
Two to be elected.

Ward 4
Two to be elected.

Ward 5
Two to be elected.

Ward 6
Two to be elected.

School trustees

References

External links
 City of Greater Sudbury Municipal Election site

Greater Sudbury municipal election
2000